Abdra is a genus in the family Brassicaceae. It is found in the United States of America and contains two species, Abdra aprica and Abdra brachycarpa.

References

Brassicaceae genera
Brassicaceae